Infinite is a 2021 American science fiction action film directed by Antoine Fuqua. The screenplay, which was written by Ian Shorr, is based on a story by Todd Stein, which is itself adapted from D. Eric Maikranz's 2009 novel The Reincarnationist Papers. The film stars Mark Wahlberg, Chiwetel Ejiofor, Sophie Cookson, Jason Mantzoukas, Rupert Friend, Toby Jones and Dylan O'Brien.

The film was digitally released on Paramount+ on June 10, 2021, following delays from its original August 2020 theatrical release due to the COVID-19 pandemic. It received negative reviews from critics who criticized the performances and screenplay, with some comparing it unfavorably with other films like The Matrix.

Plot

In 1985 Mexico City, Heinrich Treadway tries to escape the authorities and a man, Bathurst. He and his associates, Abel and Leona speak about "the Egg", which Treadway stole from Bathurst. Treadway tells Abel that if he does not survive, the latter must remember to "look inside". He drives off a bridge, jumping from his car in mid-air and onto a crane 150 feet away. However, Treadway watches helplessly as Bathurst arrives and kills Abel and Leona.

In 2020 New York City, Evan McCauley suffers from schizophrenia. Because of past institutionalization and violent behavior, he cannot get a job. Needing meds, he forges a katana for a local gangster, even though he was never trained as a bladesmith. After the deal goes south, Evan makes his escape but is later arrested. A man at the police station introduces himself as Bathurst, and claims they have known each other for centuries.

Nora Brightman bursts into the room, and helps Evan escape. She explains that about 500 individuals, known as the Infinites, can remember all their past lives. They're divided between two groups:  the Believers, including Nora, who want to make the world better, and the Nihilists, including Bathurst, who want to exterminate all life on Earth. The Nihilists have developed weapons to prevent people from being reborn, and trap their souls inside computer chips, and they developed an egg shaped weapon that will destroy all life on Earth, although Evan (Treadway's reincarnation) stole and hid the egg during his past life.

Nora (Leona's reincarnation) explains that most Infinites remember their past lives around puberty, which is why Evan was diagnosed schizophrenic. But Evan struggles to regain Treadway's memories, as a result of trauma endured from accidents earlier in life. However, another Infinite named the Artisan has a machine that restores Evan's memories.

He hid the egg inside his past body, shortly before Bathurst killed him.

Bathurst overhears this, gets Evan's old body, and finds the egg. But before he can detonate it, the Believers get the egg back, trap Bathurst's soul inside a computer chip, and free the souls of all their comrades whom Bathurst had trapped in computer chips, including Abel's. Although Evan and Nora die in the process.

Years later, Nora and Abel are reborn and they meet at the Beginning. Evan is reborn in Jakarta, Indonesia. Artisan, now older, visits him and offers a katana to the younger Evan, who regains his memories upon recognizing him.

Cast

Production

Development
D. Eric Maikranz self-published The Reincarnationist Papers in 2009. Due to his difficulties to find a literary agent to have his book adapted into a film, he announced a campaign in the first edition of the book, offering to his readers a commission to someone who successfully pitched a film adaptation of his book to a Hollywood producer. By eighteen months, he received an email from Rafi Crohn, a junior executive at a Hollywood production company who found his book in a Nepalese hostel. (Maikranz paid the commission to Crohn in December 2019.) 

In March 2017, Deadline reported that Paramount Pictures had bought the rights to Shorr and Stein's adaptation, which was described as Wanted meets The Matrix, with Mark Vahradian and Lorenzo di Bonaventura along with John Zaozirny and Crohn set to produce the film. The same Deadline article mistakenly called Shorr and Stein's screenplay as a spec script and Maikranz's book as "unpublished". By November 2018, Paramount began talks with Antoine Fuqua to direct the film. It was announced in February 2019 that Chris Evans had entered negotiations to star in the film, with Fuqua officially confirmed as director. That same month, John Lee Hancock was reported to have provided rewrites on Shorr's script. In June, Evans dropped out of the project due to scheduling issues with Defending Jacob, with Mark Wahlberg entering negotiations to replace him. Wahlberg was confirmed in August, with Sophie Cookson and Dylan O'Brien added to the cast. In September, Chiwetel Ejiofor, Jóhannes Haukur Jóhannesson, Rupert Friend and Jason Mantzoukas were cast. Tom Hughes was cast in October.

Production
Filming began in September 2019. Scenes were shot in central Cardiff, Farnborough Airport and an indoor ski facility, The Snow Centre, during a week long shutdown to the public. Filming was also done at ex-Rothschild stately home, Mentmore Towers in Buckinghamshire, in London, Mexico City, Guanajuato, Nepal, New York City, Scotland, Cambodia and the Alps.

Music

Harry Gregson-Williams, who worked with director Antoine Fuqua on his previous films, composed the film score. Paramount Music & La-La Land Records has released the soundtrack.

Release
Infinite was originally scheduled for a theatrical release on August 7, 2020, but was delayed to May 28, 2021, due to the COVID-19 pandemic. It was delayed again to September 24, 2021, when A Quiet Place Part II was moved to the May slot. On May 6, 2021, Paramount cancelled Infinites theatrical release, and instead digitally released it via Paramount+ on June 10, 2021. In countries where Paramount+ isn't available as a streaming service, the film was released through ViacomCBS-owned SVOD services Paramount Play and Paramount+ on August 23, 2021. The film was released on Blu-ray and DVD on May 17, 2022, by Paramount Home Entertainment, mostly for customers who are not subscribers to Paramount+.

Reception

Critical response 
The site's critics consensus reads, "An initially intriguing sci-fi thriller that quickly veers into incoherence, Infinite is as inane as it is inconsequential." According to Metacritic, which assigned a weighted average score of 28 out of 100 based on 27 critics, the film received "generally unfavorable reviews."

Ty Burr of The Boston Globe gave the film 1.5/4 stars and wrote: "Heading straight to streaming platform Paramount+ without the embarrassment of appearing in theaters first, the movie is both blissfully incoherent and weirdly generic, as if it had been assembled from the spare parts of other movies and glued together with stuntwork." From The Hollywood Reporter, David Rooney said: "Infinite is a soulless grind. Juiced up with a succession of CG-enhanced accelerated chases and fight action interspersed with numbing bursts of high-concept geek speak, Antoine Fuqua's sci-fi thriller isn't helped by a lead performance from Mark Wahlberg at his most inexpressive."

In his review for Variety, Peter Debruge called the film "Matrix-meets-The Old Guard wannabe" and wrote: "The more you start to nitpick this movie, the more innumerable its plot holes appear, until the whole thing collapses in on itself." Justin Chang of the Los Angeles Times said: "The script doesn't reincarnate so much as it recycles, drawing freely on the nested realities of Inception, the free-your-mind metaphysics of The Matrix and the amnesiac-assassin revelations of the Jason Bourne movies. Maybe watch one of those tonight instead." Robert Daniels of RogerEbert.com gave the film 0.5/4 stars, saying that "rather than crafting a high-concept science-fiction marvel, Fuqua's Infinite relies on shoddy VFX and ropey world-building for the worst film of his career."

The New York Times listed the film as one of the "Worst Films of 2021".

Accolades

References

External links
 

2021 science fiction action films
2020s American films
2020s English-language films
American science fiction action films
Di Bonaventura Pictures films
Films about reincarnation
Films based on American novels
Films based on science fiction novels
Films directed by Antoine Fuqua
Films not released in theaters due to the COVID-19 pandemic
Films produced by Lorenzo di Bonaventura
Films produced by Mark Wahlberg
Films scored by Harry Gregson-Williams
Films set in 1985
Films set in 2020
Films set in Jakarta
Films set in Mexico City
Films set in New York City
Films shot in Cardiff
Films shot in Hampshire
Films shot in Hertfordshire
Films shot in London
Films shot in Mexico City
Films shot in Nepal
Films shot in New York City
Films shot in Scotland
Films shot in Thailand
Paramount Pictures films
Paramount+ original films